Major-General Sir Vincent William Tregear, KCB (1842 - ?) was a British army officer.

The son of Vincent Tregear of the Indian Educational Department, he was educated privately. He entered the Bengal Army in 1859.

He was appointed a Major in 1879,  Brevet Lieutenant Colonel in 1884,  Lieutenant-Colonel in 1885, and Colonel in 1888. He was appointed a Major-General in 1897 and retired in the same year. He was transferred to the Unemployed Supernumerary List in 1902.

Tregear commanded the 9th Bengal Infantry and was Colonel on the Staff at Multan from 1895-97.

He served in the Second Anglo-Afghan War, 1879-80 and took part in the Lushai Expedition, 1889 and the Chin-Lushai Expedition of 1889-90. For his services in the Chin-Lushai Expedition, he was appointed a Companion of the Order of the Bath (CB) in 1890.

He married Jane Charlotte (died 1899), daughter of William Oswald Bell, in 1867. 

He was appointed a Knight Commander of the Order of the Bath in the 1909 Birthday Honours.

References

Sources
 The Indian Biographical Dictionary, 1915 via Wikisource

1842 births
Military personnel of British India
Knights Commander of the Order of the Bath
Year of death missing